Raorchestes longchuanensis (Longchuan bubble-nest frog or Longchuan small treefrog) is a species of frog in the family Rhacophoridae. It is found in the Gaoligong and Hengduan Mountains in Yunnan, China (including the eponymous Longchuan) and in adjacent northern Vietnam (Lai Châu Province), and possibly in Myanmar.

Raorchestes longchuanensis is a small species; males measure  in snout–vent length. It inhabits shrubland in river valleys. It is common but easily overlooked due to its small size. It is potentially threatened by habitat loss.

References

External links
 

longchuanensis
Amphibians of China
Amphibians of Vietnam
Taxonomy articles created by Polbot
Amphibians described in 1978